The stripe-breasted seedeater (Crithagra striatipectus) is a species of finch in the family Fringillidae.
It is native to Sudan, Ethiopia, and Kenya.

The stripe-breasted seedeater was formerly conspecific with Reichard's seedeater (Crithagra reichardi), but was split as a distinct species by the IOC in 2021.

References

stripe-breasted seedeater
Birds of Southern Africa
stripe-breasted seedeater
stripe-breasted seedeater